Oh My Ghost is a 2018 Thai-language television series starring Arak Amornsupasiri, Vivid Bavornkiratikajorn and Daraneenute Bhothipiti and is a remake of the 2015 South Korean series by the name. The plot revolves around the chef Jiew (Nuengthida Sophon) who occasionally sees ghosts, thanks to a shaman grandmother. One of the ghosts she sees is Khaopoon (Keerati Mahaplearkpong) who is a young virgin girl who needs to have sex to cross over.

It was released on 24 September 2018 on True4U.

Cast
 Nuengthida Sophon as Jiew
 Arak Amornsupasiri as Chef Artit
 Keerati Mahaplearkpong as Khaopun
 Vivid Bavornkiratikajorn as Chef Ren
 Daraneenute Bhothipiti as Aunt Poo
 Nat Sakdatorn as Muadprin

Release
Oh My Ghost was released on True4U on 24 September 2018.

References

External links
 
 

2010s Thai television series
2018 Thai television series debuts
2018 Thai television series endings
Thai television soap operas
Thai television series based on South Korean television series
Thai-language television shows
Television series by CJ E&M